Buck Mitty, known as Humbug, is a fictional character appearing in American comic books published by Marvel Comics. Humbug was originally a supervillain but later became a superhero and a member of the Heroes for Hire.

Publication history

Humbug first appeared in Web of Spider-Man #19 (Oct 1986).

Fictional character biography
Buck Mitty was the senior entomology professor at Empire State University until his funding was cut off.  Desperate to prove the value of the insect world, as well as to gain enough wealth to continue his research, Mitty designed the Humbug costume to achieve his goals, by whatever means necessary. Humbug intended to begin his career by stealing a shipment of black pearls, but a group of criminals beat him to the punch, and he fled when Spider-Man showed up to take them out. He next targeted an armored car government cash transfer. While he overpowered the guards and blew open the car, he had no way to transport the large shipment, as he had previously blown out one of the tires, to prevent them from escaping. At this time, Spider-Man came on the scene and, after a short struggle, turned Humbug's sonics back on himself, destroying his equipment. The cops then took him away. Mitty's sentence was commuted to time served, and he was released from prison. He renewed his awesome entomological onslaught, now dedicated to punishing ESU for their betrayal. He first tried to steal some rare paintings from their art department to finance his research, but found that the art department had been relocated, when he blasted into the women's locker room. Embarrassed, he fled the scene.

Regrouping, he broke into the physics building, to steal some of the super-conductive ceramics. The noise of his assault drew Spider-Man, who again turned Humbug's power back on him, this time blasting him out through a window. Spider-Man's web saved Mitty but Humbug distracted him by blowing up some cop cars. Spider-Man tracked Humbug to his old entomology lab, where he took a woman hostage. Spider-Man turned the tables on him, by grabbing a jar containing some of his specimens: "Let the girl go, Humbug! Or these roaches die screaming!" Humbug surrendered, appalled at Spider-Man's cruelty, and was sent back to jail.

Later, Humbug attended the Springdale branch of the Bar with no Name, where he bragged about the newly redesigned Tomazooma.

In his very own one-shot special called "Spider-Man: Bug Stops Here", Humbug attacked the New York Museum of Natural History to finance his research by attempting to steal a rare scarab amulet. Spider-Man, being present at the time of the robbery, confronted his old nemesis. Spider-Man eventually led Humbug to a place of the museum that was damaged by termites, and Humbug fell through the floor broken by those termites. During the fall, Humbug was knocked out upon landing on the lower-level floor.

Discovering that Humbug had renewed his attack on the museum, the mercenary known as Deadpool was hired by unknown parties to prevent it. Deadpool eventually caught up with Humbug, but one of Humbug's insect buddies warned him of the attack. Humbug fired sonic blasts at Deadpool, causing the mercenary to go both deaf and mute. Furious, Deadpool chased Humbug into a woman's dorm. Deadpool then tried to determine Humbug's secret identity, and nearly killed two innocent men, before figuring out that entomology was the study of insects, and thus making the connection between Mitty and Humbug. He then attacked Humbug in his lab, doused him with honey, and then hurled a jar of South American fire ants on him. Humbug tried in vain to blast off the fire ants as they devoured him, and after a few minutes, Deadpool declared Humbug to be dead.

However, while the outer layer of Humbug's skin was eaten by the ants, he made a deal with them. They let him live and he got them younger and tastier victims. Rodney, the leader of the ants, stayed with Humbug after this.

Heroes for Hire
Following the events of the superhuman Civil War, Humbug began trying to redeem himself, and in doing so joined up with the new Heroes for Hire super-hero team. During his adventures with the team, he gains the personal attention of the villains Insecticide, and the Headmen.

He is apparently eaten by giant insects while on a mission in Antarctica, but turns out to be alive and well along with new powers. His personality changes, however, as he becomes obsessed with serving the bugs on earth. He is advised by the insects that they must return to New York for the Hulk and his Warbound are fast approaching. In the World War Hulk series, Humbug turned on Earth's hive and the Heroes for Hire to serve the Brood queen of Hulk's Warbound, No-Name. No-Name uses him as a host for her gestating eggs.

It was later revealed that Earth's hive knew that Humbug would turn on them and in fact used him as a Trojan Horse to transport their own agents into the queen's hive. These agents then shot the queen with a beam, claiming afterwards to have sterilized her. When the queen gloated that her hivelings were near hatching inside of Humbug, the Earth-hive agents revealed that Humbug had been poisoned beforehand, dooming both him and the queen's eggs. Meanwhile, mutated and dying in agony, Humbug begged Shang-Chi to mercy kill him.  Shang-Chi granted his request by tearing his head off.

Humbug's remains beneath New York served as material used by the Bug-Lords of the Savage Land to create their agent Macrothrax, who wore a costume with a helmet very similar to that of its progenitor.

Powers and abilities
Humbug uses some audio tapes and a series of amplifiers to broadcast the noises of various insect species, which can incapacitate others or damage materials.

Starting in his Deadpool appearance, he began to demonstrate the ability to communicate with insects.

Following Heroes for Hire #9, Humbug received a massive increase in his powers, as well as an exo-suit. He has demonstrated superhuman strength, speed, agility and senses, and the ability to communicate with any insectoid in the world and possibly beyond Earth.

When the Black Cat destroyed his helmet, it was revealed that his skin had taken on an insect-like appearance.

However, it was revealed that the suit itself was infested with insects from Earth's hive when the helmet sprouted legs. The bug helmet also displayed its ability to fire a laser beam, suggesting that most of Humbug's new abilities were from the exo-suit or the bugs within it.

References

Characters created by David Michelinie
Characters created by Marc Silvestri
Comics characters introduced in 1986
Fictional entomologists
Fictional professors
Marvel Comics characters with superhuman strength
Marvel Comics male superheroes
Marvel Comics male supervillains
Marvel Comics mutates
Marvel Comics superheroes
Marvel Comics supervillains
Spider-Man characters